The University of the Pacific Arthur A. Dugoni School of Dentistry is the dental school of University of the Pacific. It is located in San Francisco's South of Market (SOMA) neighborhood in the U.S. state of California.

History
The school was founded in 1896 as the College of Physicians and Surgeons with programs in dentistry, medicine, and pharmacy; Stanford School of Medicine and UoP dental were once the same institution before they split into two in 1918. In 1918, the college focused its education program solely on dentistry but retained its name as the College of Physicians and Surgeons until it was incorporated into the University of the Pacific in 1962. In 2004 the school was named in honor of Arthur A. Dugoni, a former president of the American Dental Association, who served 28 years as dean.

Despite rumors in 2008 that the Advanced General Dentistry Clinic located in Stockton, California, would close due to a lack of public funding, the clinic remained open. The dental school has twelve clinics open in San Francisco, Oakland, Union City and Stockton.

University of the Pacific still relies heavily upon the Ryan White HIV/AIDS Treatment Modernization Act funding to provide services for patients with HIV/AIDS; this funding is used to reimburse the school for services provided but has not increased in recent years despite increased costs of providing services.

Three-year curriculum
UoP maintains an accelerated three-year DDS curriculum. Students complete a full curriculum of pre-clinical and basic sciences classes in their first year of dental school, as opposed to years one and two at other universities.

Academic programs
3-year Doctor of Dental Surgery (DDS) Program
2-year International Dental Studies (IDS) Program
27-month Orthodontics Residency Program
27-month Endodontic Residency Program
14-month Dental Hygiene Program

Admissions

The average class size at University of the Pacific Arthur A. Dugoni School of Dentistry is about 140 students.

DAT Academic Average: 22

Average Overall GPA: 3.5

See also

American Student Dental Association

References

External links
Arthur A. Dugoni School of Dentistry website

Universities and colleges in San Francisco
Dentistry
Dental schools in California
Educational institutions established in 1896
1896 establishments in California